An encyclopedia (American English) or encyclopædia (British English) is a reference work or compendium providing summaries of knowledge either general or special to a particular field or discipline. Encyclopedias are divided into articles or entries that are arranged alphabetically by article name or by thematic categories, or else are hyperlinked and searchable. Encyclopedia entries are longer and more detailed than those in most dictionaries. Generally speaking, encyclopedia articles focus on factual information concerning the subject named in the article's title; this is unlike dictionary entries, which focus on linguistic information about words, such as their etymology, meaning, pronunciation, use, and grammatical forms.

Encyclopedias have existed for around 2,000 years and have evolved considerably during that time as regards language (written in a major international or a vernacular language), size (few or many volumes), intent (presentation of a global or a limited range of knowledge), cultural perspective (authoritative, ideological, didactic, utilitarian), authorship (qualifications, style), readership (education level, background, interests, capabilities), and the technologies available for their production and distribution (hand-written manuscripts, small or large print runs, Internet). As a valued source of reliable information compiled by experts, printed versions found a prominent place in libraries, schools and other educational institutions.

The appearance of digital and open-source versions in the 21st century, such as Wikipedia, has vastly expanded the accessibility, authorship, readership, and variety of encyclopedia entries.

Etymology

However, the two separate words were reduced to a single word due to a scribal error by copyists of a Latin manuscript edition of Quintillian in 1470. The copyists took this phrase to be a single Greek word, enkyklopaedia, with the same meaning, and this spurious Greek word became the New Latin word encyclopaedia, which in turn came into English. Because of this compounded word, fifteenth-century readers and since have often, and incorrectly, thought that the Roman authors Quintillian and Pliny described an ancient genre.

Characteristics

The modern encyclopedia was developed from the dictionary in the 18th century. Historically, both encyclopedias and dictionaries have been researched and written by well-educated, well-informed content experts, but they are significantly different in structure. A dictionary is a linguistic work which primarily focuses on alphabetical listing of words and their definitions. Synonymous words and those related by the subject matter are to be found scattered around the dictionary, giving no obvious place for in-depth treatment. Thus, a dictionary typically provides limited information, analysis or background for the word defined. While it may offer a definition, it may leave the reader lacking in understanding the meaning, significance or limitations of a term, and how the term relates to a broader field of knowledge.

To address those needs, an encyclopedia article is typically not limited to simple definitions, and is not limited to defining an individual word, but provides a more extensive meaning for a subject or discipline. In addition to defining and listing synonymous terms for the topic, the article is able to treat the topic's more extensive meaning in more depth and convey the most relevant accumulated knowledge on that subject. An encyclopedia article also often includes many maps and illustrations, as well as bibliography and statistics. An encyclopedia is, theoretically, not written in order to convince, although one of its goals is indeed to convince its reader of its own veracity.

Four major elements 

There are four major elements that define an encyclopedia: its subject matter, its scope, its method of organization, and its method of production:

 Encyclopedias can be general, containing articles on topics in every field (the English-language Encyclopædia Britannica and German Brockhaus are well-known examples). General encyclopedias may contain guides on how to do a variety of things, as well as embedded dictionaries and gazetteers. There are also encyclopedias that cover a wide variety of topics from a particular cultural, ethnic, or national perspective, such as the Great Soviet Encyclopedia or Encyclopaedia Judaica.
 Works of encyclopedic scope aim to convey the important accumulated knowledge for their subject domain, such as an encyclopedia of medicine, philosophy or law. Works vary in the breadth of material and the depth of discussion, depending on the target audience.
 Some systematic method of organization is essential to making an encyclopedia usable for reference. There have historically been two main methods of organizing printed encyclopedias: the alphabetical method (consisting of a number of separate articles, organized in alphabetical order) and organization by hierarchical categories. The former method is today the more common, especially for general works. The fluidity of electronic media, however, allows new possibilities for multiple methods of organization of the same content. Further, electronic media offer new capabilities for search, indexing and cross reference. The epigraph from Horace on the title page of the 18th century Encyclopédie suggests the importance of the structure of an encyclopedia: "What grace may be added to commonplace matters by the power of order and connection."
 As modern multimedia and the information age have evolved, new methods have emerged for the collection, verification, summation, and presentation of information of all kinds. Projects such as Everything2, Encarta, h2g2, and Wikipedia are examples of new forms of the encyclopedia as information retrieval becomes simpler. The method of production for an encyclopedia historically has been supported in both for-profit and non-profit contexts. The Great Soviet Encyclopedia mentioned above was entirely state sponsored, while the Britannica was supported as a for-profit institution. By comparison, Wikipedia is supported by volunteers contributing in a non-profit environment under the organization of the Wikimedia Foundation.

Encyclopedic dictionaries 

Some works entitled "dictionaries" are actually similar to encyclopedias, especially those concerned with a particular field (such as the Dictionary of the Middle Ages, the Dictionary of American Naval Fighting Ships, and Black's Law Dictionary). The Macquarie Dictionary, Australia's national dictionary, became an encyclopedic dictionary after its first edition in recognition of the use of proper nouns in common communication, and the words derived from such proper nouns.

Differences between encyclopedias and dictionaries 

There are some broad differences between encyclopedias and dictionaries. Most noticeably, encyclopedia articles are longer, fuller and more thorough than entries in most general-purpose dictionaries. There are differences in content as well. Generally speaking, dictionaries provide linguistic information about words themselves, while encyclopedias focus more on the things for which those words stand. Thus, while dictionary entries are inextricably fixed to the word described, encyclopedia articles can be given a different entry name. As such, dictionary entries are not fully translatable into other languages, but encyclopedia articles can be.

In practice, however, the distinction is not concrete, as there is no clear-cut difference between factual, "encyclopedic" information and linguistic information such as appears in dictionaries. Thus encyclopedias may contain material that is also found in dictionaries, and vice versa. In particular, dictionary entries often contain factual information about the thing named by the word.

Pre-modern encyclopedias 

The earliest encyclopedic work to have survived to modern times is the Naturalis Historia of Pliny the Elder, a Roman statesman living in the 1st century AD. He compiled a work of 37 chapters covering natural history, architecture, medicine, geography, geology, and all aspects of the world around him. This work became very popular in Antiquity, was one of the first classical manuscripts to be printed in 1470, and has remained popular ever since as a source of information on the Roman world, and especially Roman art, Roman technology and Roman engineering.

The Spanish scholar Isidore of Seville was the first Christian writer to try to compile a summa of universal knowledge, the Etymologiae (c. 600–625), also known by classicists as the Origines (abbreviated Orig.). This encyclopedia—the first such Christian epitome—formed a huge compilation of 448 chapters in 20 books based on hundreds of classical sources, including the Naturalis Historia. Of the Etymologiae in its time it was said quaecunque fere sciri debentur, "practically everything that it is necessary to know". Among the areas covered were: grammar, rhetoric, mathematics, geometry, music, astronomy, medicine, law, the Catholic Church and heretical sects, pagan philosophers, languages, cities, animals and birds, the physical world, geography, public buildings, roads, metals, rocks, agriculture, ships, clothes, food, and tools.

Another Christian encyclopedia was the Institutiones divinarum et saecularium litterarum of Cassiodorus (543-560) dedicated to the Christian divinity and to the seven liberal arts. The encyclopedia of Suda, a massive 10th-century Byzantine encyclopedia, had 30,000 entries, many drawing from ancient sources that have since been lost, and often derived from medieval Christian compilers. The text was arranged alphabetically with some slight deviations from common vowel order and place in the Greek alphabet.

From India, the Siribhoovalaya (Kannada: ಸಿರಿಭೂವಲಯ), dated between 800 A.D. to 15th century, is a work of kannada literature written by Kumudendu Muni, a Jain monk. It is unique because rather than employing alphabets, it is composed entirely in Kannada numerals. Many philosophies which existed in the Jain classics are eloquently and skillfully interpreted in the work.

The enormous encyclopedic work in China of the Four Great Books of Song, compiled by the 11th century during the early Song dynasty (960–1279), was a massive literary undertaking for the time. The last encyclopedia of the four, the Prime Tortoise of the Record Bureau, amounted to 9.4 million Chinese characters in 1,000 written volumes.

There were many great encyclopedists throughout Chinese history, including the scientist and statesman Shen Kuo (1031–1095) with his Dream Pool Essays of 1088; the statesman, inventor, and agronomist Wang Zhen (active 1290–1333) with his Nong Shu of 1313; and Song Yingxing (1587–1666) with his Tiangong Kaiwu. Song Yingxing was termed the "Diderot of China" by British historian Joseph Needham.

Printed encyclopedias 
Before the advent of the printing press, encyclopedic works were all hand copied and thus rarely available, beyond wealthy patrons or monastic men of learning: they were expensive, and usually written for those extending knowledge rather than those using it.
During the Renaissance, the creation of printing allowed a wider diffusion of encyclopedias and every scholar could have his or her own copy. The De expetendis et fugiendis rebus by Giorgio Valla was posthumously printed in 1501 by Aldo Manuzio in Venice. This work followed the traditional scheme of liberal arts. However, Valla added the translation of ancient Greek works on mathematics (firstly by Archimedes), newly discovered and translated. The Margarita Philosophica by Gregor Reisch, printed in 1503, was a complete encyclopedia explaining the seven liberal arts.

Financial, commercial, legal, and intellectual factors changed the size of encyclopedias. Middle classes had more time to read and encyclopedias helped them to learn more. Publishers wanted to increase their output so some countries like Germany started selling books missing alphabetical sections, to publish faster. Also, publishers could not afford all the resources by themselves, so multiple publishers would come together with their resources to create better encyclopedias. Later, rivalry grew, causing copyright to occur due to weak underdeveloped laws.
John Harris is often credited with introducing the now-familiar alphabetic format in 1704 with his English Lexicon Technicum: Or, A Universal English Dictionary of Arts and Sciences: Explaining not only the Terms of Art, but the Arts Themselves – to give its full title. Organized alphabetically, its content does indeed contain explanation not merely of the terms used in the arts and sciences, but of the arts and sciences themselves. Sir Isaac Newton contributed his only published work on chemistry to the second volume of 1710.

Encyclopédie

Encyclopædia Britannica

Brockhaus Enzyklopädie

Encyclopedias in the US
In the United States, the 1950s and 1960s saw the introduction of several large popular encyclopedias, often sold on installment plans. The best known of these were World Book and Funk and Wagnalls. As many as 90% were sold door to door. Jack Lynch says in his book You Could Look It Up that encyclopedia salespeople were so common that they became the butt of jokes. He describes their sales pitch saying, "They were selling not books but a lifestyle, a future, a promise of social mobility." A 1961 World Book ad said, "You are holding your family's future in your hands right now," while showing a feminine hand holding an order form.

Digital encyclopedias

Physical media 
By the late 20th century, encyclopedias were being published on CD-ROMs for use with personal computers. This was the usual way computer users accessed encyclopedic knowledge from the 1980s and 1990s. Later DVD discs replaced CD-ROMs and from mid-2000s internet encyclopedias became dominant and replaced disc-based software encyclopedias. 

CD-ROM encyclopedias were usually a macOS or Microsoft Windows (3.0, 3.1 or 95/98) application on a CD-ROM disc. The user would execute the encyclopedia's software program to see a menu that allowed them to start browsing the encyclopedia's articles, and most encyclopedias also supported a way to search the contents of the encyclopedia. The article text was usually hyperlinked and also included photographs, audio clips (for example in articles about historical speeches or musical instruments), and video clips. In the CD-ROM age the video clips had usually a low resolution, often 160x120 or 320x240 pixels. Such encyclopedias which made use of photos, audio and video were also called multimedia encyclopedias. However, because of the online encyclopedia, CD-ROM encyclopedias have been declared obsolete.

Microsoft's Encarta, launched in 1993, was a landmark example as it had no printed equivalent. Articles were supplemented with video and audio files as well as numerous high-quality images. After sixteen years, Microsoft discontinued the Encarta line of products in 2009. Other examples of CD-ROM encyclopedia are Grolier Multimedia Encyclopedia and Britannica.

Digital encyclopedias enable "Encyclopedia Services" (such as Wikimedia Enterprise) to facilitate programatic access to the content.

Online

Free encyclopedias 

The concept of a free encyclopedia began with the Interpedia proposal on Usenet in 1993, which outlined an Internet-based online encyclopedia to which anyone could submit content and that would be freely accessible. Early projects in this vein included Everything2 and Open Site. In 1999, Richard Stallman proposed the GNUPedia, an online encyclopedia which, similar to the GNU operating system, would be a "generic" resource. The concept was very similar to Interpedia, but more in line with Stallman's GNU philosophy.

It was not until Nupedia and later Wikipedia that a stable free encyclopedia project was able to be established on the Internet.

The English Wikipedia, which was started in 2001, became the world's largest encyclopedia in 2004 at the 300,000 article stage. By late 2005, Wikipedia had produced over two million articles in more than 80 languages with content licensed under the copyleft GNU Free Documentation License. As of August 2009, Wikipedia had over 3 million articles in English and well over 10 million combined in over 250 languages. Wikipedia currently has  articles in English.

Since 2003, other free encyclopedias like the Chinese-language Baidu Baike and Hudong, as well as English language encyclopedias such as Citizendium and Knol have appeared, the latter of which has been discontinued.

See also

 Bibliography of encyclopedias
 Biographical dictionary
 Encyclopedic knowledge
 Encyclopedism
 Fictitious entry
 History of science and technology
 Lexicography
 Library science
 Lists of encyclopedias
 Thesaurus
 Speculum literature

Notes

References

 
 
 
 C. Codoner, S. Louis, M. Paulmier-Foucart, D. Hüe, M. Salvat, A. Llinares, L'Encyclopédisme. Actes du Colloque de Caen, A. Becq (dir.), Paris, 1991.

External links

 Encyclopaedia and Hypertext 
 Internet Accuracy Project – Biographical errors in encyclopedias and almanacs
 Encyclopedia – Diderot's article on the Encyclopedia from the original Encyclopédie.
 De expetendis et fugiendis rebus – First Renaissance encyclopedia
 Errors and inconsistencies in several printed reference books and encyclopedias 
 Digital encyclopedias put the world at your fingertips CNET article
 Encyclopedias online University of Wisconsin Stout listing by category
 Chambers' Cyclopaedia, 1728, with the 1753 supplement
 Encyclopædia Americana, 1851, Francis Lieber ed. (Boston: Mussey & Co.) at the University of Michigan Making of America site
 Encyclopædia Britannica, articles and illustrations from 9th ed., 1875–89, and 10th ed., 1902–03.
 

 
Works about history